Mitar Mrkela (Serbian Cyrillic: Митар Мркела; born 10 July 1965 in Belgrade) is a retired Serbian football player, who was a member of the Yugoslavian team that won the bronze medal at the 1984 Summer Olympics in Los Angeles, California.

Career
He started his senior pro career with OFK Beograd in 1981 at only 16 years and 16 days of age (at that time the youngest ever in the Yugoslav First League), before moving on to Red Star Belgrade in 1983 where he stayed until 1990. After appearing in one league game for Red Star in 1990/91 season, he transferred to Dutch club Twente Enschede and stayed there for two seasons. He played several matches for Beşiktaş J.K. in the 1992-1993 season and scored 4 goals, before returning to the Netherlands with Cambuur Leeuwarden.

Mrkela holds distinction as the youngest player ever to play for SFR Yugoslavia national squad. He was only 17 years and 130 days old when he made his national team debut on 17 November 1982 during a Euro 1984 qualifier versus Bulgaria in Sofia. Head coach Todor Veselinović brought him on in the 17th minute in place of injured Zvonko Živković. However, despite a lot of early promise, Mrkela would go on to make only 5 national team appearances, scoring 1 goal.

Post-football
For a time in early 2000s, Mrkela was the president of City of Belgrade Football Association. He then became the youth coach in the OFK Beograd system.

In July 2005, soon after Dragan Stojković took over as club president from Dragan Džajić, Mrkela became the director of Red Star Belgrade youth academy - a job up to that moment performed by Goran Đorović.

After leaving his post at Red Star in December 2008, he became the sporting director at OFK Beograd.

Personal
During the early 1990s Mrkela married actress Lidija Vukićević. The couple divorced in 2000. They have two sons, Andrej Mrkela, born in 1992, who is also a professional footballer and currently plays for Spartak Subotica and David, born in 1997.

For a while, Mrkela was politically active in the Serbian Renewal Movement (SPO).

References
 Profile on Serbian national football team website

http://www.tff.org/Default.aspx?pageId=526&kisiId=24411

1965 births
Living people
Yugoslav footballers
Yugoslav expatriate footballers
Yugoslavia international footballers
Serbian footballers
Footballers at the 1984 Summer Olympics
Olympic footballers of Yugoslavia
Olympic bronze medalists for Yugoslavia
OFK Beograd players
Red Star Belgrade footballers
FC Twente players
SC Cambuur players
Beşiktaş J.K. footballers
Yugoslav First League players
Eredivisie players
Süper Lig players
Expatriate footballers in the Netherlands
Expatriate footballers in Turkey
Association football midfielders
Footballers from Belgrade
Olympic medalists in football
Yugoslav expatriate sportspeople in the Netherlands
Serbian expatriate footballers
Serbia and Montenegro expatriate footballers
Serbia and Montenegro footballers
Serbia and Montenegro expatriate sportspeople in the Netherlands
Serbia and Montenegro expatriate sportspeople in Turkey
Medalists at the 1984 Summer Olympics
Serbian people of Croatian descent